Big CBS Prime was an India based English language  television channel started as a joint venture between Reliance Broadcast Network Limited and CBS Studios International(now Paramount International Networks).

The channel went on air and began telecasting from 29 November 2010. It was High quality cover In including
The company, BIG CBS Networks had rolled out its three channels in a phased manner. The other channels from the network are Big CBS Spark, which was aimed at the youth and Big CBS Love, the channel that targeted women. Reliance Broadcast Network Limited also launched a Regional Bouquet of Channels like Spark Punjabi, Big Magic, big RTL amongst others.

Availability and distribution 
Big CBS Prime was being distributed through DTH platforms such as Big TV, Videocon d2h and Airtel Digital TV, and on cable network  via Digicable, Den Networks and Hathway, InCable and 7Star.

Shows broadcast on Big CBS Prime

Dexter
Galileo Extreme
Bullets, Blood & a Fistful of Ca$h
America's Got Talent
Big Wheels
The Jerry Springer Show
Survivor
Aspire
Blue Bloods
13: Fear Is Real
CSI: New York
Hawaii Five-0

See also
 Big CBS Spark
 Big CBS Love

References

External links
Official Site
BIG CBS Prime on Facebook
BIG CBS Prime on Twitter

English-language television stations in India
Television stations in Mumbai
CBS Television Network
Television channels and stations disestablished in 2013
Television channels and stations established in 2010
2010 establishments in Maharashtra
2013 disestablishments in India
Former CBS Corporation subsidiaries